Because You're Mine is a 1952 musical comedy film starring Mario Lanza. Directed by Alexander Hall, the film also stars Doretta Morrow, James Whitmore, and Dean Miller.

Plot
Opera singer superstar Renato Rossano (Mario Lanza) is drafted into the U.S. Army. His sergeant, "Bat" Batterson (James Whitmore), is an opera fan who admires Rossano and wishes Rossano to appraise his sister's (Doretta Morrow) singing voice. The rest of his platoon as well as the company commander disapproves of Batterson's showing favoritism to Rossano by excusing him from normal training.

Rossano schemes to have Batterson allow him to go to New York, supposedly to have his manager appraise Batterson's sister Brigit's singing voice but in reality allowing him to do a performance. After realizing he's been tricked, the sergeant sets out to make Rossano's military life considerably more difficult.

Cast
 Mario Lanza as Renaldo Rossano
 Doretta Morrow as Bridget Batterson
 James Whitmore as Sergeant 'Bat' Batterson
 Dean Miller as Ben Jones
 Rita Corday as Francesca Landers (as Paula Corday)
 Jeff Donnell as Patty Ware
 Spring Byington as Mrs. Edna Montville
 Curtis Cooksey as General Louis Montville
 Don Porter as Captain Burton Nordell Loring
 Eduard Franz as Albert Parkson Foster
 Bobby Van as Artie Pilcer
 Ralph Reed as Horsey Jackson
 Celia Lovsky as Mrs. Rossano
 Alexander Steinert as Maestro Paradoni

Production
Because You're Mine had an unpleasant and troubled production.
Principal photography of the film was interrupted and during the hiatus Lanza put on a considerable amount of weight. According to his manager, Lanza then began to lose weight and ended filming at less than 160 pounds. This resulted in some challenges for both the wardrobe artists and the film editors who had to deal with Lanza's substantial fluctuations in weight over the course of production.  In one scene, Lanza's character is about to enter a church; in the exterior shot, filmed late in the production schedule, he is a trim 160 pounds in his military uniform; but, when he is inside the church, in a scene filmed earlier, he is an obese 230 pounds.

Lanza's notorious reputation for being temperamental and difficult to work with began with the production of Because You"re Mine. Lanza hated the script and initially refused to appear in the film, viewing it as a much inferior follow-up to his previous film  The Great Caruso, which was MGM's biggest box office success of 1951. Dore Schary, MGM studio head at the time, has recounted Lanza's petulant and boorish behavior on the set, which included the brazen sexual harassment of costar Doretta Morrow. Morrow found the experience of making Because You're Mine so harrowing, she never appeared in another film. Lanza had requested Lana Turner as his leading lady, but producer Joe Pasternak insisted on casting an actress who could sing.

The soldiers in the film wear a shoulder sleeve insignia that resembles the 28th Infantry Division that is worn by actual soldiers in footage of a military parade used in the movie.

Music
The title song, "Because You're Mine", earned an Academy Award nomination for Best Original Song. Written by Sammy Cahn and Nicholas Brodszky, it became Lanza's third and final million-selling effort.

Musical highlights in the film included "Granada", "The Lord's Prayer", and "Addio, Addio" from Rigoletto.

Release
Because You're Mine premiered September 25, 1952 in New York City, going into wide release on October 3. According to MGM records, it earned $2,267,000 in the US and Canada, and $2,304,000 elsewhere, resulting in profits of $735,000. It was the fifth most popular movie at the British box office in 1953, and was chosen for the inaugural Royal Command Film Performance of Queen Elizabeth II's reign.

Though popular at the box office, it was not a critical success. Bosley Crowther of The New York Times voiced a common opinion, finding the film's plot "banal" and observing, "It's really Mario Lanza's singing that should and will attract attention to this technicolored film."

References

External links
 
 
 
 

1952 films
1952 musical comedy films
Metro-Goldwyn-Mayer films
American musical comedy films
Military humor in film
Films directed by Alexander Hall
Films produced by Joe Pasternak
1950s English-language films
1950s American films